Robert Daniel Thwaites Yerburgh, 1st Baron Alvingham (10 December 1889 – 27 November 1955) was a British Conservative politician.

Alvingham was the son of Robert Armstrong Yerburgh and Elma Amy Thwaites, and was educated at Harrow and University College, Oxford. He served with the Royal Army Service Corps during First World War and achieved the rank of captain in 1917 and Brevet-Major in 1919. In 1922 he was elected to the House of Commons for South Dorset, a seat he held until 1929. His father had been intended for a peerage in 1916 but died before the patent was completed. In the 1929 Dissolution Honours Yerburgh was raised to the peerage as Baron Alvingham, of Woodfold in the County Palatine of Lancaster.

Lord Alvingham married, firstly, his first cousin Dorothea Gertrude, daughter of John Eardley Yerburgh, in 1911. They had one son and two daughters. After her death in 1927 he married, secondly, Maud Lytton Grey Morgan, daughter of Charles Ford Morgan (an actor known professionally as Lytton Grey), in 1936. They had no children. Lord Alvingham died in November 1955, aged 65, and was succeeded in the barony by his only son Robert. Lady Alvingham died in 1992.

Notes

References
Kidd, Charles, Williamson, David (editors). Debrett's Peerage and Baronetage (1990 edition). New York: St Martin's Press, 1990, 

www.familysearch.org

External links 
 

1889 births
1955 deaths
Barons in the Peerage of the United Kingdom
People educated at Harrow School
Alumni of University College, Oxford
Royal Army Service Corps officers
Yerburgh, Robert
Yerburgh, Robert
Yerburgh, Robert
UK MPs who were granted peerages
Yerburgh, Robert
British Army personnel of World War I
Barons created by George V